The Journal of the History of Ideas is a quarterly peer-reviewed academic journal covering intellectual history, conceptual history, and the history of ideas, including the histories of philosophy, literature and the arts, natural and social sciences, religion, and political thought.

The journal was established in 1940 by Arthur Oncken Lovejoy and Philip P. Wiener and has been published by the University of Pennsylvania Press since 2006. In addition to the print version, current issues are available electronically through Project MUSE, and earlier ones through JSTOR. The editors-in-chief are Manan Ahmed (Columbia University), Martin J. Burke (City University of New York), Stefanos Geroulanos (New York University), Ann E. Moyer (University of Pennsylvania), Sophie Smith (University of Oxford), and Don Wyatt (Middlebury College). Distinguished former editors include Arthur Lovejoy, John Herman Randall, Paul Oskar Kristeller, Philip P. Wiener, Donald Kelley, and Anthony Grafton. Since 2015, the Journal is complemented by a blog that publishes short articles and interviews related to intellectual history.

Abstracting and indexing 
The journal is abstracted and indexed in:

Further reading

External links 
 
 Website of the Journal of the History of Ideas Blog
Issues from Volume 57 (1996) through current issue: https://muse.jhu.edu/journal/91
Issues from Volune 1 (1940) through 2019: https://www.jstor.org/journal/jhistoryideas

History journals
Western philosophy
History of philosophy journals
Publications established in 1940
English-language journals
Quarterly journals
University of Pennsylvania Press academic journals